The 2010 Australian Football European Championship was the inaugural AFL Europe Championship, a 16-a-side Australian football competition between European countries. Contested between eight national teams, the Championships were won by Ireland.

Teams
Pool A
 Denmark
 Finland
 Great Britain
 Iceland
Pool B
 Croatia
 Germany
 Ireland
 Sweden

Results

Round One
 Sweden: 16.17(113) d  Croatia: 2.5(17)
 Great Britain: 11.16(82) d  Finland: 1.2(8)
 Ireland: 18.10(118) d  Germany: 0.0(0)
 Denmark: 19.16(130) d  Iceland: 2.1(13)

Round Two
 Great Britain: 11.20(86) d  Iceland: 4.12(36)
 Ireland: 20.21(141) d  Croatia: 6.8(44)
 Denmark: 14.20(104) d  Finland: 2.1(13)
 Sweden: 8.14(62) d  Germany: 4.2(26)

Round Three
 Iceland: 8.9(57) d  Finland: 2.5(17)
 Croatia: 9.12(66) d  Germany: 3.3(21)
 Denmark: 10.11(71) d  Great Britain: 5.5(35)
 Ireland: 13.21(99) d  Sweden: 2.4(16)

7th Playoff
 Germany: 5.9(39) d  Finland: 0.5(5)

5th Playoff
 Croatia: 19.11(125) d  Iceland: 12.11(83)

3rd Playoff
 Sweden: 5.9(39) d  Great Britain: 3.11(29)

Grand Final
 Ireland: 11.2(68) d  Denmark: 8.3(51)

Ladder

References

Australian rules football competitions